Russell M. Nelson (born 1924), is an American physician and leader in The Church of Jesus Christ of Latter-day Saints

Russell Nelson may also refer to:
 Russ Nelson (born 1958), American computer programmer
 J. Russell Nelson (1929–2016), American educator